The swamp nightjar or Natal nightjar (Caprimulgus natalensis) is a crepuscular and nocturnal bird in the nightjar family found in Africa.

Distribution and habitat
It is found in Angola, Botswana, Burundi, Cameroon, Chad, Republic of the Congo, Democratic Republic of the Congo, Ivory Coast, Gabon, Gambia, Ghana, Guinea, Kenya, Liberia, Mali, Mozambique, Namibia, Nigeria, Rwanda, Sierra Leone, South Africa, South Sudan, Tanzania, Uganda, Zambia, and Zimbabwe. The swamp nightjar can be found in swamps, marshes and bogs, but also in forest edges.

References

External links
 Swamp nightjar - Species text in The Atlas of Southern African Birds.

swamp nightjar
Birds of Sub-Saharan Africa
swamp nightjar
Taxonomy articles created by Polbot